Dansk Skytte Union (DSkyU), literally The Danish Shooting Union, is a Danish association for sport shooting with rifle, pistol and shotgun. The association consists of over 50.000 members and 450 associated clubs.

References

External links 
 Official homepage of Dansk Skytte Union

Shooting sports in Denmark
Shooting sports organizations
Sports organizations of Denmark
National members of the European Shooting Confederation